Franklin Independent School District is a public school district based in Franklin, Texas, United States.

In 2009, the school district was rated "recognized" by the Texas Education Agency.

Schools
Franklin High School (Grades 9-12)
Franklin Middle (Grades 5-8)
Reynolds Elementary (Grades PK-4)

Notable alumni
Frank Estes Cole (Class of 1925), educator and member of both houses of the Louisiana State Legislature between 1944 and 1960

References

External links
Franklin ISD

School districts in Robertson County, Texas